Stictonectes is a genus of beetles in the family Dytiscidae, containing the following species:

 Stictonectes azruensis (Théry, 1933)
 Stictonectes canariensis Machado, 1987
 Stictonectes epipleuricus (Seidlitz, 1887)
 Stictonectes escheri (Aubé, 1838)
 Stictonectes formosus (Aubé, 1838)
 Stictonectes lepidus (Olivier, 1795)
 Stictonectes occidentalis Fresneda & Fery, 1990
 Stictonectes optatus (Seidlitz, 1887)
 Stictonectes rufulus (Aubé, 1838)
 Stictonectes samai Schizzerotto, 1988

References

Dytiscidae